The San Francisco Fire Department (SFFD) provides firefighting, hazardous materials response services, technical rescue services and emergency medical response services to the City and County of San Francisco, California.

History
Volunteer Department: 1849-1866

The first great fire in San Francisco originated on Christmas Eve, 1849. By the time it burned itself out; fifty buildings were gone at a loss of $1,500,000. On Christmas night several citizens who had been firemen in the East met and formed fire companies.  Heading the group was Frederick D. Kohler who was chosen as the first Chief. The Town Council held a special called meeting that afternoon and passed a resolution to organize a fire department. The resolution states, in part, “Therefore…..to protect the town against another such calamity by organizing fire companies”, and the San Francisco Fire Department was born.  
Town Council met on January 28, 1850, and formally elected Kohler as the first Chief Engineer of the San Francisco Fire Department.

Paid Department: 1866–Present

The legal basis for the origin of the Paid Department stemmed from legislation titled, "An Act to Establish a Paid Fire Department for the City and County of San Francisco."  (Approval by the State Legislature was granted on March 2, 1866.)  The Act provided for a five-man Board of Fire Commissioners to manage the affairs of the department.
The Fire Department consisted of a Chief Engineer, two Assistant Chiefs, one Corporation Yard Keeper and six steam fire engine companies.  Each engine company was to have one foreman, one engineer, one driver, one fireman, and eight extra or "call" men.  There were two Hook-and-Ladder Companies each consisting of one foreman, one driver, one tillerman and twelve extra men.  Additionally, there were three Hose Companies, each consisting of one foreman, one driver, one steward and six extra men.
During April 1866, the Board of Supervisors purchased four steam fire engines and one hose reel from the Amoskeag Manufacturing Company of Manchester, New Hampshire.  This purchase was made at a cost of $17,655.  In July of the same year the Supervisors also bought twenty-seven horses to provide motive power for the new and heavier equipment.
One of the first acts of the new Board of Fire Commissioners was to appoint the department executive officers.  On October 6, 1866, Franklin E. R. Whitney was appointed Chief Engineer; H.W. Burckes, First Assistant Chief; and Charles H. Ackerson, Second Assistant Chief.
The department went into active operation on December 3, 1866, making it the first paid Fire Department West of the Mississippi.  Daniel Hayes, was appointed Superintendent of Steamers, Tom Sawyer, Corporation Yard Keeper, and John L. Durkee, Fire Marshal

In 1906, the department was considered on a par with those of the larger cities on the East Coast, but found itself reduced to fighting the fire of 1906 in the quake aftermath with axes and shovels, as most of the city's water mains were broken and cisterns drained. Fire Chief Dennis T. Sullivan suffered mortal wounds in his home by a falling chimney early in the disaster and subsequently died in the hospital.

In 1955, Earl Gage Jr. was hired as the first Black firefighter. His work as director of community services is credited with diversifying the department.

Operations

Fireboats

The SFFD has three fireboats that are docked at Pier . Fireboat 1, the Phoenix, was constructed in 1954 and is fitted with three deck monitors, a water town and two under pier monitors. Fireboat 2, the Guardian,  was constructed in 1950 and is the oldest fireboat in the fleet. A third new 85-foot fireboat (Fireboat 3) was christened the St. Francis in October 2016.

Fire Stations and Apparatus

Below is a full listing of all fire station and company locations in the City & County of San Francisco according to Battalion and Division. As of 2019, SFFD has purchased several Ferrara Engines and Two New Ferrara Tillers. One Tiller is getting assigned to Truck 13 and the other tiller is still unknown

There are also three SFFD-operated fire stations located at the San Francisco International Airport in San Mateo County.

SFO Stations
All apparatus at SFO go by the 'Rescue' call sign, whether Engine, Truck, ARFF Crash, Medic Unit, or Command SUV.

Disbanded fire companies
Throughout the history of the San Francisco Fire Department there have been several fire companies which have been closed due to budget cuts and the restructuring of engine company numbers in 1972–1973.

 Engine Company 27 (356 7th St.): Disbanded July 1, 1976
 Engine Company 30 (1300 4th St.): Disbanded July 1, 1976
 Engine Company 45 (1348 45th Ave.): Disbanded September 26, 1972
 Engine Company 46 (441 12th Ave.): Disbanded May 16, 1972
 Engine Company 47 (499 41st Ave.): Disbanded May 25, 1973
 Engine Company 49 (2155 18th Ave.): Disbanded July 20, 1972
 Truck Company 20 (285 Olympia Way): Disbanded September 30, 1980
 Division 1 (530 Sansome St.): Disbanded January 2, 2002
 Battalion 5 (1443 Grove St.): August 30, 2003, Reinstated January 4, 2017
 Battalion 11 (798 Wisconsin St.): Disbanded July 1, 1970
 Salvage Company 1 (356 7th St.): Disbanded 1980
 Salvage Company 2 (115 Drumm St.): Disbanded 1975
 Salvage Company 3 (441 12th Ave.): Disbanded 1977
 Salvage Company 4 (299 Vermont St.): Disbanded 1986

In popular culture

 The SFFD was the responding fire department to a major high-rise fire disaster in the 1974 film, The Towering Inferno. The film cast many actual firefighters from the department and used SFFD fire trucks during the filming. Fire Station 38 was also shown. The exterior shots were done at the Bank of America Building.
 Actor Steve McQueen was given a San Francisco Fire Department Honorary Battalion Chief badge #33 with ID in recognition for his accurate portrayal of San Francisco Battalion Fire Chief Mike O'Halloran. 
 The SFFD was also used in the Dirty Harry film series, particularly Rescue Squad 2 in Dirty Harry.
 When a veteran SFFD firefighter is killed and Adrian Monk is blinded in a mysterious attack at a firehouse in the Monk episode "Mr. Monk Can't See a Thing", Monk must rely on his other senses to solve the bizarre case. In the course of the episode, he finds that the killer came to the firehouse to steal a fireman's coat and even finds that the man who blinded him had just beforehand killed a woman a few blocks away and set fire to her house (that fire was the one the engine company had been responding to when the murder at the firehouse took place). The depicted fire station, Fire Station 53, is a fictitious station. The exterior of the station was represented by Fire Station 1 of the Los Angeles Fire Department.
 In the Monk novel series by Lee Goldberg, Joe Cochran, Natalie Teeger's occasional lover, is an SFFD firefighter, making appearances in the novels Mr. Monk Goes to the Firehouse, Mr. Monk and the Two Assistants, and Mr. Monk in Outer Space.
 The SFFD was featured in two Emergency! television movies in 1978 and 1979, where L.A. County firefighter/paramedics Gage and DeSoto run calls with the firefighters of Rescue Squad 2.
 The NBC Television show Trauma followed the fictional lives of SFFD paramedics, EMTs and flight medics.
 The department is featured in the 1985 James Bond film A View to a Kill. After San Francisco City Hall is set ablaze by the villainous Max Zorin in an attempt to kill Bond, the SFFD arrives on scene and assists Roger Moore's character in escaping the burning building and then ultimately "borrows" a SFFD ladder truck in order to outrun the police officers chasing him on the suspicion that his character set the blaze.
 The CBS television series Rescue 911s episode #107 the 4th segment featured the San Francisco Fire Department responding to an apartment fire and in one of the scenes, sparks shoot over a firetruck from a broken wire from a powerline.  The station was Station #9, built in 1915.

References

External links

San Francisco Fire Department official website
San Francisco Fire Museum
History of the San Francisco Fire Department at the SF Museum
SFFD Fire Reserve website

Fire departments in California
Fire Department
Ambulance services in the United States
Medical and health organizations based in California